Michael George Carter (born 1939) is a British Islamic studies scholar, Emeritus Professor of Arabic at the University of Oslo and Honorary Professor in the Centre for Medieval Studies in Sydney University.
He is known for his works on Arabic linguistics.
A festschrift in his honor was published in 2006.
He is a winner of King Faisal Prize.

Books
 Sibawayhi (Makers of Islamic Civilisation) 
 A History of the Arabic Language
 Modern Written Arabic: A Comprehensive Grammar 
 Sibawayhi's Principles: Arabic Grammar and Law in Early Islamic Thought (Resources in Arabic and Islamic Studies)

References

Living people
1939 births
Alumni of the University of Oxford
Academic staff of the University of Oslo
Linguists from the United Kingdom
Arabists
Grammarians of Arabic
Academic staff of the University of Sydney